Private William W. Burritt (1831 to October 18, 1901) was an American soldier who fought in the American Civil War. Burritt received the country's highest award for bravery during combat, the Medal of Honor, for his action at Vicksburg in Mississippi on 27 April 1863. He was honored with the award on 8 July 1896.

Biography

Burritt was born in Campbell, New York in 1831 and enlisted into the 113th Illinois Infantry at Chicago, Illinois. He died on 18 October 1901 and his remains are interred at the Leavenworth National Cemetery in Kansas.

Medal of Honor citation

See also

List of American Civil War Medal of Honor recipients: A–F

References

1831 births
1901 deaths
People of Illinois in the American Civil War
Union Army officers
United States Army Medal of Honor recipients
American Civil War recipients of the Medal of Honor